

List

Notes

a.      Some cars were fitted with Attica 200 cc, Sachs 191 cc  engines.

References

G